Zaječice is a municipality and village in Chrudim District in the Pardubice Region of the Czech Republic. It has about 1,000 inhabitants.

Administrative parts
The village of Studená Voda is an administrative part of Zaječice.

References

External links

Villages in Chrudim District